Cobusca Nouă is a village in the Anenii Noi District of Moldova.

References

Communes of Anenii Noi District